Croisilles is a village and commune in the Pas-de-Calais department of the Hauts-de-France region of France.

Geography
A small farming village located 8 miles (13 km) south of Arras at the junction of the D5 and D9 roads. Many of the residents commute to work in Arras or the town of Bapaume to the south.

The village is bypassed to the north and east by the LGV Nord high speed line and the A1 Autoroute. The junction with the Angy branch of the LGV Nord, in the direction of Arras, is located to the north of Croisilles.

In addition to its church, the village has two bars, a supermarket (including petrol station), a pharmacy, a post office and a small DIY store, which is operated by the local farmers' co-operative. There is also a village stadium (including indoor sports hall), an ecole maternale (kindergarten) and an ecole primaire (primary school), which is attached to the mairie (town hall).

Population

Places of interest
 The church of St.Martin, rebuilt, as was most of the town, after World War I.
 The two Commonwealth War Graves Commission cemeteries.
 Some remains of an 11th-century castle.

See also
Communes of the Pas-de-Calais department

References

External links

 The first CWGC cemetery at Croisilles
 The second CWGC cemetery at Croisilles
 Croisilles on the Quid website 
 Website with information about Croisilles 

Communes of Pas-de-Calais